Bar Vip is the fifth local season of the reality The Bar in Poland.

Synopsis
Start Date: 11 September 2004.
End Date: 18 December 2004.
Duration: 99 days.
Contestants:
The Finalists: Ewelina (The Winner) & Bartek L (Runner-up).
Evicted Contestants: Agata M, Agnieszka, Anna R, Anna We, Anna Wo, Bartek M, Iwona, Jacek, Jarek, Kamil, Karolina, Łukasz, Maciek, Marta, Michał, Monika T, Monika W, Piotr, Sebastian & Żaneta.
Voluntary Exits: Agata T, Bartosz, Irek, Kasia, Róża, Witold & Wojtek.

Contestants

Nominations

References

2004 Polish television seasons